Cory Alexander Henry (born February 27, 1987) is an American singer-songwriter, pianist, organist, and record producer. A former member of Snarky Puppy, Henry launched his solo artist career in 2018 with Art of Love, his first independent release. On October 30, 2020, he released his sophomore full-length project called Something to Say which included Marc E. Bassy written track "No Guns" . That same year he released Art of Love Live and Christmas With You both under Culture Collective management and records.

Henry was selected by Quincy Jones to headline his curated Soundtrack of America series opening of The Shed in NYC. On August 5, 2021, Beats Electronics premiered a commercial featuring athlete Sha'Carri Richardson featuring the track "Run to Glory" which was co-produced and written by Cory Henry, Kanye West and Dr. Dre. Henry was later credited as a producer and composer for the song "24" from West's tenth studio album Donda.

On September 6, 2022, Henry announced on Twitter that he would be retiring from the music business "very soon."

Early life
Henry was born in Brooklyn, New York, where he was playing both the piano and B3 organ at just two years old. Only five years old, they already called him "Master Henry" for his ability to accompany any song in any key on the Hammond Organ. He played a show at the Apollo Theater when he was six.

Music career
His musical touring began in 2006, and he has since toured with many mainstream artists, including Bruce Springsteen, Michael McDonald, P. Diddy, Boyz II Men, Kenny Garrett, and The Roots, and gospel artists, among them Israel Houghton, Donnie McClurkin, Kirk Franklin, and Yolanda Adams.

He released his album First Steps on July 21, 2014, with Wild Willis Jones Records. The album charted on the Billboard charts and placed on the Top Jazz Albums and Top Heatseekers Albums, peaking at numbers five and 30, respectively. His second album, a live recording, The Revival, was released on March 18, 2016, by GroundUp Music. The album charted on the Top Gospel Albums and Top Jazz Albums, where it peaked at number five and number two respectively.

On April 13, 2018, Henry released his debut single "Trade It All" with his band The Funk Apostles. Three months later, on July 13, 2018, Cory released "Art of Love", his first album with The Funk Apostles. Henry has frequently collaborated with Vulfpeck.

In 2018, Henry left Snarky Puppy to launch his solo career with his first independent project, Art of Love. On October 31, 2020, Henry released his sophomore full-length record called "Something to Say."
In October 2019, Henry taught a songwriting workshop at the Brown Arts Institute at Brown University.

Throughout 2020 and 2021, Cory released three personal projects and was featured as a writer and performer on multiple other releases including Imagine Dragons' "Cutthroat" and "Follow You", Jazmine Sullivan's "First Noel", Marc E. Bassy's "Free Like Me", and more. He appeared on Kanye West's album Donda, playing organ on "24" (aka "Run to Glory"). On September 10, 2021, Henry performed the national anthem with Michelle Williams at the National Football League's season opener in Tampa Bay, Florida.

On September 17, 2021, Henry released his third solo album "Best of Me", featuring Henry performing on vocals, Hammond B3 organ, Moog synthesizer, and Harpejji. According to Henry, the album is "a collection of songs written and inspired by [his] musical heroes," with influences including Stevie Wonder, Marvin Gaye, Donny Hathaway, P-Funk, and James Brown.

On December 25, 2021, Cory was featured on Frank Ocean's 9-minute untitled song release on his Beats 1 radio show Blonded Radio. Cory is also featured as a credited writer and performer on Spanish singer and songwriter Rosalía's 2022 album Motomami and song G3 N15.

On July 2, 2022, Cory was featured again with Imagine Dragons in "Continual".

In 2022, Cory released a studio album Operation Funk, which he followed up with a live version of the album that released later in the year.

Awards
Grammy Awards

|-
|rowspan="4"|2022
|Something to Say
|Best Progressive R&B Album
|
|-
|New Light
|Best Progressive R&B Album
|
|-
|Donda
|Album of The Year
|
|-
|Donda
|Best Rap Album
|
|-
|rowspan="4"|2023
|Operation Funk
|Best Progressive R&B Album
|TBA
|}

Henry previously earned three GRAMMY wins as a member of the adventurous ensemble Snarky Puppy, including Best Contemporary Instrumental Album for their critically acclaimed album Culcha Vulcha. In 2021 his first solo produced studio album Something to Say was nominated for a GRAMMY in the Best Progressive R&B Album category. Henry is also nominated as a co-producer/writer on Eric Bellinger's New Light—again in the Best Progressive R&B Album category—and as a co-producer/writer on Kanye West's Donda, which is nominated for both Album of the Year and Best Rap Album.

Discography

References

External links
 

1987 births
Living people
African-American jazz musicians
African-American Christians
American jazz organists
American male organists
Musicians from Brooklyn
Songwriters from New York (state)
21st-century American musicians
Jazz musicians from New York (state)
21st-century organists
21st-century American male musicians
American male jazz musicians
GroundUPmusic artists
21st-century American keyboardists
Snarky Puppy members
African-American songwriters
21st-century African-American musicians
20th-century African-American people
American male songwriters